Warrnambool College is a government high school (years 7–12) in the regional town of Warrnambool in south-west Victoria, Australia.

The school now known as Warrnambool College started out in 1907 as Warrnambool Agricultural High School.  After a number of changes, the school opened as Warrnambool College in 1995 after the merger of Warrnambool Secondary College and Warrnambool North Secondary College.

Warrnambool College consists of two campuses. The main campus, which comprises the majority of the school community, is located in an extensive set of school buildings on Grafton Road, near the Warrnambool racecourse. The second campus, called the WAVE school, is an alternative educational setting for students who have had difficulty fitting into mainstream education. It is located in west Warrnambool.

Houses 
In 2011 Warrnambool College introduced a pastoral care system through six houses: Belfast, Childers, Flagstaff, Hopkins, Logans and Merri. These houses are named after local colonial named landmarks in the region, including the Merri and Hopkins Rivers Every year, a "celebration day" is held for each house, at different times of the year, in order to raise money for each house's charity, which are as follows:

Hopkins: Francis Foundation

Merri: Taksenkangbloung Community Centre

Childers: Daffodil Day

Belfast: Gillin Boys Foundation

Flagstaff: Leila Rose Foundation

Logans: Warrnambool & District Food Share

School profile 
Warrnambool College hosts a campus of the Clontarf Football Academy for male indigenous students. The staffing profile for the school (as at 2014) was - principal and two assistant principals, 85 full-time-equivalent teachers and 30 full-time-equivalent education support staff.

School colours 
The Warrnambool College school colours are navy blue, white and green, as displayed in the school uniform. 
The houses that all staff and students are placed in as part of the pastoral care program have the following colours:

Belfast - green

Childers -  yellow

Flagstaff -   red

Hopkins -   blue

Logans -  purple

Merri - orange

Notable alumni and staff

Alumni
 Sir John Eccles: Nobel Prize–winning scientist

Staff
 George Furner Langley: headmaster for 16 years

References 

Secondary schools in Victoria (Australia)
Educational institutions established in 1994
1994 establishments in Australia
Warrnambool